is a dramma giocoso in three acts composed by Antonio Salieri. The Italian libretto was by Lorenzo Da Ponte after a work by Giovanni Bertati.

Performance history

The opera was first given on 6 December 1784 at the Burgtheater in Vienna.

Roles

References

1784 operas
Drammi giocosi
Operas by Antonio Salieri
Opera world premieres at the Burgtheater
Italian-language operas
Operas